M-212 is a state trunkline highway in the US state of Michigan. It provides access from M-33 to the community of Aloha on Mullett Lake's eastern shore and Aloha State Park, where the highway ends.

M-212 was assigned on December 29, 1937, from the intersection with Second Street to an intersection with US Highway 23 (US 23). In 1940, the state of Michigan rerouted US 23 and replaced it with M-33.

Route
M-212 begins at an intersection with Second Street and the Tromble Trail north of the Aloha State Park entrance gate. The community was originally a stop on the Detroit and Mackinac Railway, named after a trip to Hawaii by the local sawmill owner. The state highway runs northward on Second Street away from the park gate before turning eastward on Center Street. The railroad right-of-way is now the North Eastern State Trail, which M-212 crosses along Center Street in Aloha. Eastward, the highway intersects Third and Fourth streets, both of which are separated by woodlands and residences. This is followed by a large clearing, giving way to a farm to the north and more residences to the south. Beyond this there is a large field where M-212 terminates at an intersection with M-33 in Aloha Township. According to the Lansing State Journal, "most people could walk the darn thing in about 20 minutes."

History
The Michigan State Highway Department assigned the M-212 designation to its current alignment from what was then US 23 on December 29, 1937. It has broadly remained the same since. Originally, US 23 ran along the highway at the eastern terminus of M-212, but the highway department realigned this along the shore of Lake Huron in 1940 and later assigned M-33 to the old alignment, which remains the case.

M-212 was called a "smidgin" of a highway as part of a group of roadways that lacked the glamor of other highways in a profile of the shortest highways in the state in 1972. In 1996, the highway became the state's shortest when M-209 in the Sleeping Bear Dunes National Lakeshore was transferred to local control and lost its state highway designation. Since M-212 gained this superlative, in 2018 a radio station in Kalamazoo called it "likely" the state's quietest highway, or the highway with the lowest annual average daily traffic.

Major intersections

See also

References

External links

M-212 at Michigan Highways
Michigan State Trunkline Record Holders at Michigan Highways
Michigan's Shortest Highway Leads to This Beautiful State Park at TravelTheMitten.com

212
Transportation in Cheboygan County, Michigan
State highways in the United States shorter than one mile